The Karate Kid is a 1984 American martial arts drama film written by Robert Mark Kamen and directed by John G. Avildsen. It is the first installment in the Karate Kid franchise, and stars Ralph Macchio, Pat Morita, Elisabeth Shue and William Zabka. The Karate Kid follows Daniel LaRusso (Macchio), a teenager taught karate by Mr. Miyagi (Morita) to help defend himself and compete in a tournament against his bullies, one of whom is Johnny Lawrence (Zabka), the ex-boyfriend of his love interest Ali Mills (Shue).

Kamen was approached by Columbia Pictures to compose a film similar to Avildsen's previous success Rocky (1976), after signing the director. Kamen drew inspiration from his own life when writing the film. As a result, he maintained strong opinions regarding cast, and petitioned heavily for Morita's inclusion. Preparations for the film began immediately after the final edit of the script was complete, and casting took place between April and June 1983. Principal photography began on October 31, 1983, in Los Angeles, and completed by December 16. The film was Macchio's second major film role following The Outsiders (1983).

The Karate Kid was theatrically released in the United States on June 22, 1984. The film received mostly positive reviews from critics, many of whom praised the action sequences, writing, themes, performances, and music. The film was also a commercial success, grossing over  worldwide, making it one of the highest-grossing films of 1984 and Hollywood's biggest sleeper hit of the year. The film revitalized the acting career of Morita, who was previously known mostly for comedic roles, and earned him a nomination for the Academy Award for Best Supporting Actor. The film subsequently launched a media franchise and is credited for popularizing karate in the United States.

Plot

In 1984, 17-year-old Daniel LaRusso and his mother Lucille move from Newark, New Jersey, to Reseda, Los Angeles, California. Their apartment's handyman is an eccentric, but kind and humble Okinawan immigrant named Mr. Miyagi.

At a beach party, Daniel befriends Ali Mills, a high school cheerleader, drawing the attention of her arrogant ex-boyfriend Johnny Lawrence, a black belt and the top student from the Cobra Kai dojo, which teaches an aggressive form of karate. Johnny and his Cobra Kai gang (Bobby Brown, Tommy, Jimmy, and Dutch) continually bully Daniel. On Halloween, after Daniel sprays water on Johnny with a hose as payback, he and his gang pursue Daniel down the street and brutally beat him until Mr. Miyagi intervenes and easily defeats them.

Amazed, Daniel asks Mr. Miyagi to teach him karate. Although Mr. Miyagi declines, he agrees to accompany Daniel to Cobra Kai to resolve the conflict. They meet the sensei, John Kreese, an ex-Special Forces Vietnam veteran who callously dismisses the peace offering. Miyagi then proposes that Daniel enter the upcoming Under 18 All-Valley Karate Championship tournament to compete against Kreese's students on equal terms and requests that the bullying ceases while he trains. Kreese agrees to the terms but warns that if Daniel does not show up for the tournament, the harassment will continue for both of them.

Daniel's training starts with days of menial chores that seemingly only serve to make him Miyagi's slave. When he becomes frustrated, Miyagi demonstrates that repetition of these chores has helped him to learn defensive blocks through muscle memory. Their bond develops, and Miyagi opens up to Daniel about his life, including the dual loss of his wife and son in childbirth at the Manzanar internment camp while he was serving with the 442nd Infantry Regiment during World War II in Europe, where he received the Medal of Honor.

Through Mr. Miyagi's teaching, Daniel learns both karate and essential life lessons, such as the importance of personal balance, reflected in the principle that martial arts training is as much about training the spirit as the body. Daniel applies the life lessons Miyagi has taught him to strengthen his relationship with Ali. On Daniel's 18th birthday, Miyagi gives him a Karate gi for the tournament and one of his own cars.

Daniel surprises the audience and competitors at the tournament by reaching the semi-finals. Johnny advances to the finals, scoring three unanswered points against Darryl Vidal. Kreese instructs his second-best student, Bobby Brown, one of his more compassionate students and the least vicious of Daniel's tormentors, to disable Daniel with an illegal attack to the knee. Bobby reluctantly does so, severely injuring Daniel and getting himself disqualified.

Daniel is taken to the locker room, where the physician determines that he cannot continue. However, he believes that if he quits, his tormentors will have gotten the best of him, so he convinces Miyagi to use a pain suppression technique to help him continue. Daniel returns to fight as Johnny is about to be declared the winner by default. The match is a seesaw battle, with neither able to break through the other's defense.

The match is halted when Daniel uses a scissor-leg technique to trip Johnny, delivering a blow to the back of his head and giving Johnny a nosebleed. Kreese directs Johnny to sweep Daniel's injured leg – an unethical move. Johnny looks horrified at the order but reluctantly agrees. As the match resumes and the score is tied 2–2, Johnny seizes Daniel's leg and deals a vicious elbow, doing further damage. Daniel, standing with difficulty, assumes the "Crane" stance, a technique he observed Mr. Miyagi performing on a beach. Johnny lunges toward Daniel, who jumps and executes a front kick to Johnny's face, scoring the winning point and becoming the new champion.

Having gained newfound respect for his nemesis, Johnny presents the trophy to Daniel himself, as an enthusiastic crowd carries Daniel while Miyagi looks on proudly.

Cast

 Ralph Macchio as Daniel LaRusso
 Pat Morita as Mr. Miyagi
 William Zabka as Johnny Lawrence
 Elisabeth Shue as Ali Mills
 Martin Kove as John Kreese
 Randee Heller as Lucille LaRusso
 Chad McQueen as Dutch
 Ron Thomas as Bobby Brown
 Tony O'Dell as Jimmy
 Rob Garrison as Tommy

Production

Development
The Karate Kid is a semi-autobiographical story based on the life of its screenwriter, Robert Mark Kamen. At age 17, after the 1964 New York World's Fair, Kamen was beaten up by a gang of bullies. He thus began to study martial arts in order to defend himself. Kamen was unhappy with his first teacher who taught martial arts as a tool for violence and revenge. So he moved on to study Okinawan Gōjū-ryū karate under a Japanese teacher who did not speak English but had been a student of Chōjun Miyagi.

As a Hollywood screenwriter, Kamen was mentored by Frank Price who told him that producer Jerry Weintraub had optioned a news article about the young child of a single mother who had earned a black belt to defend himself against the neighborhood bullies. Kamen then combined his own life story with the news article and used both to create the screenplay for The Karate Kid. Additionally, given John G. Avildsen's involvement with both films, Sylvester Stallone often joked with Kamen that the writer had "ripped off" the Rocky films with The Karate Kid.

DC Comics had a character called Karate Kid. The filmmakers received special permission from DC Comics in 1984 to use the title for the film and its sequels.

Casting
A number of actors were considered for the part of Daniel, including Sean Penn, Robert Downey Jr., Charlie Sheen, Jon Cryer, Emilio Estevez, Nicolas Cage, Anthony Edwards, C. Thomas Howell, Tom Cruise, Eric Stoltz and D. B. Sweeney. Ralph Macchio was ultimately cast on the strength of his performance as Johnny Cade in The Outsiders (1983). Macchio has stated that his performance as Johnny influenced the development of Daniel LaRusso in The Karate Kid.

Macchio later commented that the character was originally named Danny Weber, but was later changed to LaRusso.

The studio originally wanted the role of Mr. Miyagi to be played by Toshiro Mifune, who had appeared in the Akira Kurosawa films Rashomon (1950), Seven Samurai (1954), and The Hidden Fortress (1958), but the actor did not speak English. Pat Morita later auditioned for the role but was rejected for the part due to his close association with stand-up comedy and with his character Arnold on the sitcom Happy Days. Afterwards,  Morita grew a beard and patterned his accent after his uncle, which led to him being cast in the role.

Crispin Glover was considered for the role of Johnny, but the studio later opted for William Zabka. After his audition, Zabka saw Macchio, who noted that Zabka scared him during his audition to the studio. When he was cast, Zabka was a wrestler with no previous training in karate. Zabka later recalled his audition, saying he was told to act out a scene from the script, while wearing a headband. He walked up to and grabbed John Avildsen, and said "Watch your mouth asshole!" He then exited the room and came back in, took his headband off and said that it was Johnny, not Billy. Avildsen then asked him about his age, and his height when compared to karate kid. Zabka responded, "Bruce Lee was smaller than Kareem Abdul Jabbar, but he beat him" in reference to Game of Death, to which Avildsen confirmed it. Avildsen was then convinced to cast Zabka for the role.

Helen Hunt and Demi Moore were also considered for the role of Ali, but Elisabeth Shue was cast based partly on a Burger King commercial that became widely popular in the early 1980s. The film marks the debut roles of both Zabka and Shue. Late in production, Valerie Harper was considered for the role of Lucille, but the studio later instated Randee Heller for the role.

Filming
Filming began on October 31, 1983, and wrapped on December 16.

The film's fight choreographer for the combat scenes was Pat E. Johnson, a Tang Soo Do karate black belt who had previously been featured in Bruce Lee's American–Hong Kong martial arts film Enter the Dragon (1973) and worked with Chuck Norris at American Tang Soo Do martial arts schools. Johnson also makes an appearance as the referee in The Karate Kid. Pat Morita's stunt double for Mr. Miyagi, Fumio Demura, is also a karate black belt who had previously worked with Bruce Lee, who learnt some nunchaku techniques from Demura.

Soundtrack
The musical score for The Karate Kid was composed by Bill Conti, a frequent collaborator of director John G. Avildsen since their initial pairing on Rocky (1976). The instrumental score was orchestrated by Jack Eskew and featured pan flute solos by Gheorge Zamfir. On March 12, 2007, Varèse Sarabande released all four Karate Kid scores in a 4-CD box set limited to 2,500 copies worldwide.

A soundtrack album was released in 1984 by Casablanca Records containing many of the contemporary songs featured in the film. Of particular note is Joe Esposito's "You're the Best", featured during the tournament montage near the end of the first film. Originally written for Rocky III (1982), "You're the Best" was rejected by Sylvester Stallone in favor of Survivor's hit song "Eye of the Tiger". Coincidentally, Survivor also performed the main theme ("The Moment of Truth" Music & Lyrics: Bill Conti, Dennis Lambert, Peter Beckett) for The Karate Kid.

Bananarama's 1984 hit song "Cruel Summer" also made its U.S. debut in The Karate Kid but was excluded from the film's soundtrack album. Other songs featured in the film but left off the album include "Please Answer Me" performed by Broken Edge and "The Ride" performed by The Matches.

Track listing for 1984 soundtrack
 "The Moment of Truth" (Survivor)
 "(Bop Bop) On the Beach" (The Flirts, Jan and Dean)
 "No Shelter" (Broken Edge)
 "Young Hearts" (Commuter)
 "(It Takes) Two to Tango" (Paul Davis)
 "Tough Love" (Shandi)
 "Rhythm Man" (St. Regis)
 "Feel the Night" (Baxter Robertson)
 "Desire" (Gang of Four)
 "You're the Best" (Joe Esposito)

Reception

Box office
The film was a commercial success, grossing  in the United States and Canada to become one of the highest-grossing films of 1984 and Hollywood's biggest sleeper hit of the year.

In the United Kingdom, the film topped the box office for two weeks and grossed £2,960,939. By 1989, the film had grossed  worldwide.

The film sold an estimated 27,072,000 tickets in the United States and Canada. The film also sold  tickets in Spain, 1,888,845 tickets in France and Germany, and 137,217 tickets in the South Korean capital of Seoul, adding up to  tickets sold in the United States, Canada, Spain, France, Germany and Seoul.

Critical response

On the review aggregator Rotten Tomatoes, the film holds an approval rating of 89% based on 44 reviews, with an average rating of 6.83/10. The website's critics consensus reads: "Utterly predictable and wholly of its time, but warm, sincere, and difficult to resist, due in large part to Morita and Macchio's relaxed chemistry." On Metacritic, the film has a weighted average score of 60 out of 100, based on 15 critics, indicating "mixed or average reviews".

On its release, Roger Ebert called the film one of the year's best, gave it four stars out of four, and described it as an exciting, sweet-tempered, heart-warming story with interesting friendships in the film. Janet Maslin of The New York Times also gave a positive review. The Karate Kid ranked #40 on Entertainment Weeklys list of the 50 Best High School Movies.

The Karate Kid launched the career of Macchio, who would turn into a teen idol featured on the covers of magazines such as Tiger Beat. It revitalized the acting career of Morita, previously known mostly for his comedic role as Arnold on Happy Days, who was nominated for the Academy Award for Best Supporting Actor for his performance as Miyagi. Morita reprised his role in three subsequent sequels, while Macchio returned for two.

Upon release of the 2010 remake, Dana Stevens wrote: "The 1984 original ... may have seemed like a standard-issue inspirational sports picture at the time, but (as with another box-office hit of the same year, The Terminator), a generation of remove reveals what a well-crafted movie it actually was. Rewatched today, the original Kid, directed by Rockys John G. Avildsen, feels smart and fresh, with a wealth of small character details and a leisurely middle section that explores the boy's developing respect for his teacher."

Accolades

Home media 
In the United Kingdom, it was watched by  viewers on television in 2017, making it the year's tenth most-watched film on UK multichannel television.

Merchandise
The film spawned a franchise of related items and memorabilia such as action figures, headbands, posters, T-shirts, and a video game. A novelization was made by B.B. Hiller and published in 1984. The novel had a scene that was in the rehearsal when Daniel encounters Johnny during school at lunch. Also at the end, there was a battle between Miyagi and Kreese in the parking lot after the tournament which was the original ending for the film and used as the beginning of The Karate Kid Part II.

In 2015, toy company Funko revived The Karate Kid action figures. Two versions of LaRusso, a version of Lawrence and a version of Miyagi were part of the line. The toys were spotted at retailers Target and Amazon.com.

Cultural influence
The series has been credited for popularizing karate in the United States.

The American experimental rock band titled 'Sweep the Leg Johnny' was a reference to a line from the film.

The 2007 music video for the song "Sweep the Leg" by No More Kings stars William Zabka (who also directed the video) as a caricature of himself and features references to The Karate Kid, including cameo appearances by Zabka's former Karate Kid co-stars.

Macchio and Zabka made a guest appearance as themselves in the How I Met Your Mother episode "The Bro Mitzvah". In the episode, Macchio is invited to Barney Stinson's bachelor party, leading to Barney shouting that he hates Macchio and that Johnny was the real hero of The Karate Kid. Towards the end of the episode, a clown in the party wipes off his makeup and reveals himself as Zabka.

Sequels and adaptations

The success of The Karate Kid spawned three more films, including two direct sequels, starting with The Karate Kid Part II in 1986. Picking up where the first film left off, the film sees Daniel accompany Miyagi on a trip to Okinawa, where he is reunited with loved ones and is challenged by an old adversary. Although a commercial success, it received mixed reviews. The Karate Kid Part III followed in 1989, which saw Kreese seek revenge on Daniel and Miyagi with the help of new allies. It was criticized for rehashing elements of the first two films. Another sequel, The Next Karate Kid (1994), was the first in the series not to include Macchio, although Morita returned as Miyagi. It follows Hilary Swank as one of his new students. A remake of the original film, also titled The Karate Kid, was released in 2010. Set in Beijing, it starred Jackie Chan and Jaden Smith and received generally favorable reviews.

Aside from the film series, an animated series based on the film, also called The Karate Kid, aired on NBC in the fall of 1989. Consisting of thirteen episodes, the series abandoned the karate tournament motif and followed Daniel and Miyagi, voiced by Joey Dedio and Robert Ito, respectively, in an adventure/quest setting.

A sequel live-action television series, Cobra Kai, debuted in 2018. Created by Josh Heald, Jon Hurwitz and Hayden Schlossberg, it stars Macchio and Zabka, who reprise their roles as LaRusso and Lawrence, respectively. Set 34 years later, Cobra Kai re-examines the "Miyagi-Verse" narrative from Johnny's point of view, his decision to reopen the Cobra Kai dojo, and the rekindling of his old rivalry with Daniel. The series draws upon all of the sequels, as well as the original film. The series also pays tribute to Morita, who died in 2005. After a guest appearance in the show's first season, Kove reprised his role as John Kreese starting in the second season, while Shue reprised her role as Ali Mills in the series' third season, and Thomas Ian Griffith as Terry Silver (from Part III) in the fourth and fifth seasons.

In January 2020, a Broadway musical adaptation of The Karate Kid was revealed to be in development. Amon Miyamoto will serve as director, with an accompanying novel being written by the original film's screenwriter Robert Mark Kamen. Drew Gasparini will serve as the lyricist and composer of the score, while Keone & Mari Madrid will choreograph the play. Kumiko Yoshii, Michael Wolk will serve as producers, with The Kinoshita Group. The cast will include Jovanni Sy as Mr. Miyagi, John Cardoza as Daniel LaRusso, Kate Baldwin as Lucille LaRusso, Alan H. Green as John Kreese, Jake Bentley Young as Johnny Lawrence, Jetta Juriansz as Ali Mills and Luis-Pablo Garcia as Freddie Fernandez. The opening date has yet to be announced.

A new Karate Kid film is in development by Sony Pictures, described as the return to the original franchise.

Book
In 2022, Ralph Macchio published the memoir Waxing On: The Karate Kid and Me (Dutton), in which he reflects upon the making of and legacy of the Karate Kid films and Cobra Kai.

See also
 Shoot Away, an arcade game that Ali and her friends play at an arcade.

References

External links

 Official trailer
 
 
 
 
 Ralph Macchio of "Cobra Kai" on Memoir "Waxing On: The Karate Kid and Me"– The View, October 18, 2022. 
 The Karate Kid and Cobra Kai – Reunited Apart, December 21, 2020
 "The Karate Kid" 30th Anniversary Panel Discussion, Q+A—sponsored by the Japanese American National Museum, Los Angeles, September 9, 2014.

1984 films
1980s coming-of-age films
1984 martial arts films
1980s sports drama films
1980s teen drama films
1980s action drama films
American coming-of-age films
American martial arts films
American sports drama films
American high school films
American teen drama films
Columbia Pictures films
1980s English-language films
Film scores
Films about educators
Films about school bullying
Films directed by John G. Avildsen
Films scored by Bill Conti
Films set in 1984
Films set in Los Angeles
Films set in New Jersey
Films set in the San Fernando Valley
Films set on beaches
Films shot in New Jersey
Films shot in Los Angeles
Films with screenplays by Robert Mark Kamen
Karate films
The Karate Kid (franchise) films
Martial arts tournament films
Varèse Sarabande soundtracks
1984 drama films
Drama film soundtracks
1980s American films